
Maidenwell is a village and civil parish in the East Lindsey district of  Lincolnshire, England. Maidenwell population is included in the civil parish of Burwell. The parish includes the village of Ruckland, the hamlets of Oxcombe, Farforth, and Worlaby.

History
A Prehistoric or Roman trackway and settlement has been identified through the village. and several Neolithic burials, including a typical early long barrow.

The village of Maidenwell, separately assessed in documents of 1334, was united with Farforth parish in 1450 or possibly 1592. Maidenwell was probably depopulated about 1400–28.  Significant earthworks of the former medieval settlement were still traceable in the 20th century.

The estate had been purchased from the late Earl of Yarborough. A Church Mission Room—lacking parish status but supported by an external parish—was built at Worlaby in 1870, whose services were taken by the rector of Louth or his curate.

Community
The village falls within the ecclesiastical parish of Ruckland with Farforth in The South Ormsby Group of the Deanery of Bolingbroke. The 2013 incumbent is the Revd Cheryl Hilliam. The parish church is the tiny Church of St Olave at Ruckland. Further churches in the parish are All Saints' at Oxcombe and St Andrew's at Farforth.

References

External links

Villages in Lincolnshire
Civil parishes in Lincolnshire
East Lindsey District